Raúl Iván Fabiani Bosio (born 23 February 1984) is an Equatoguinean footballer who plays as a centre forward for Spanish club CD Soneja.

He spent most of his extensive career in Spain, representing Alcoyano in Segunda División. He also played professionally in India and Hong Kong.

Fabiani was a member of the Equatorial Guinea national team.

Early life
Fabiani was born in Valencia, Spain to an Italian father and an Equatorial Guinean mother related to Edmundo Bossio Dioko, a politician executed during the regime of Francisco Macías Nguema.

Club career
Fabiani spent most of his senior career in the lower levels of Spanish football, mainly competing in the Valencian Community. He made his Segunda División debut in the 2011–12 season at the age of already 27, with CD Alcoyano, after having scored 12 Segunda División B goals the previous campaign to help the team return to the second level after an absence of 42 years; his first game in the second level of Spanish football occurred on 22 October 2011 as he came on as a late substitute in a 1–4 home loss against FC Barcelona B, and he netted his first and second goals in the competition on 27 May of the following year to contribute decisively to a 4–0 home win over Elche CF, but his team had already sealed their relegation.

Fabiani also represented Villarreal CF B, Moralo CP, CP Cacereño, UD Lanzarote, CD Teruel, Villajoyosa CF and Huracán Valencia CF. On 5 August 2013 the 29-year-old moved teams and countries, signing with Pune F.C. in India.

On 21 September 2013, Fabiani made his debut in the I-League, which was an eventful affair as he scored two goals, provided one assist and was also sent off after 77 minutes of play for a second bookable offence. He later sustained an injury while playing against Mohun Bagan AC which ruled him out for four months, so on 26 October he was released and replaced by Riga Mustapha, returning to former club Huracán.

In the following years, safe for a very brief spell in the Hong Kong First Division League, Fabiani continued to compete in Spanish lower league and amateur football. On 19 June 2019, he signed with CD Soneja of the Valencian regional leagues.

International career
Fabiani received his first call for Equatorial Guinea, on 29 January 2011, but he did not play in the friendly match with Congo on 9 February. The following month he was called for another exhibition game, this time against Gambia, but again he stayed on the verge of his international debut. These factors led to discomfort at Alcoyano because the club had lost him for four league matches (two for each international match), which led to the organization asking the player to reject international calls for the remainder of the season; thus, he rejected to appear for the pre-Olympic national team in two qualifying matches against Nigeria in April 2011.

Subsequently, Fabiani ceased to be called until Henri Michel, who at the same time gave little importance to the Spanish-born players, resigned from his position as national team coach. After the departure of the Frenchman and before the Brazilian's Gílson Paulo arrival at Malabo as his replacement, the player was included in the preliminary list for the 2012 Africa Cup of Nations.

Fabiani did not play in the goalless friendly match with South Africa on 6 January 2012, appearing shortly after in a non-FIFA recognized match against Cameroonian club Coton Sport FC de Garoua. He was confirmed in the roster of 23 players for the CAN tournament, played on home soil, only being fielded by the eventual quarter-finalists in the last group stage game, a 0–1 loss to Zambia.

Career statistics

Club

References

External links

Stats at FútbolEsta (in Spanish)

1984 births
Living people
Citizens of Equatorial Guinea through descent
Equatoguinean people of Italian descent
Sportspeople of Italian descent
People of Sicilian descent
People of Bubi descent
Spanish sportspeople of Equatoguinean descent
Spanish people of Italian descent
Spanish people of Bubi descent
Equatoguinean footballers
Spanish footballers
Footballers from Valencia (city)
Association football forwards
Segunda División players
Segunda División B players
Tercera División players
Divisiones Regionales de Fútbol players
Villarreal CF B players
CP Cacereño players
CD Teruel footballers
Villajoyosa CF footballers
CD Alcoyano footballers
Huracán Valencia CF players
CD Olímpic de Xàtiva footballers
Marbella FC players
CD Castellón footballers
CE L'Hospitalet players
I-League players
Pune FC players
Hong Kong First Division League players
Dreams Sports Club players
Equatorial Guinea international footballers
2012 Africa Cup of Nations players
2015 Africa Cup of Nations players
Equatoguinean expatriate footballers
Spanish expatriate footballers
Expatriate footballers in India
Expatriate footballers in Hong Kong
Equatoguinean expatriate sportspeople in India
Equatoguinean expatriate sportspeople in Hong Kong
Spanish expatriate sportspeople in India
Spanish expatriate sportspeople in Hong Kong
Águilas FC players